Printemps is a ballet made on New York City Ballet by Lorca Massine to Debussy's eponymous music from 1887. The premiere took place on January 13, 1972, at the New York State Theater, Lincoln Center.

Original cast 

   
Violette Verdy
Christine Redpath
Virginia Stuart

Reviews 
NY Times review by Clive Barnes, January 16, 1972

New York City Ballet repertory
Ballets by Lorca Massine
Ballets to the music of Claude Debussy
1972 ballet premieres